Kenézlő is a village in Borsod-Abaúj-Zemplén County in northeastern Hungary.

References

Populated places in Borsod-Abaúj-Zemplén County